This is a list of ambassadors from Iran

Current Iranian ambassadors

External links
Ministry of Foreign Affairs of Iran

 
Iran
ambassadors from Iran